Sarah Murray (born April 28, 1988) is a Canadian-American ice hockey coach and the head coach of the women's ice hockey team of Saint Mary's University of Minnesota in the Minnesota Intercollegiate Athletic Conference (MIAC) of the NCAA Division III. She served as head coach of the South Korean women's national ice hockey team during 2014 to 2018 and was the head coach of the Korean unified team at the 2018 Winter Olympics.

Playing career
Murray was born April 28, 1988 in Faribault, Minnesota to Ruth and Andy Murray. She played hockey at Shattuck-Saint Mary's, a private parochial and college-preparatory school known for its ice hockey program.
As a rookie with the Minnesota Duluth Bulldogs women's ice hockey program in the 2006–07 season, she broke her ankle in the first round of the Western Collegiate Hockey Association (WCHA) Conference Playoffs. Following the injury, Murray skated in 108 consecutive games and, in total, played 153 career games with the Bulldogs, ranking her in a third place tie all-time among program alums. Murray was a two-time NCAA Women's Ice Hockey Tournament national champion with the Bulldogs, winning the title in 2008 and 2010.

Coaching career
Murray became the head coach of the South Korean national women's ice hockey team in 2014. She was part of Team Red's coaching staff at the 2016 High Performance Camp, held in Vierumäki, Finland. Other members of Team Red's coaching staff included mentor-coach Peter Smith, assistant coach Eva-Maria Verworner, and athlete-ambassador Lyndsey Fry, among others. Murray ceased coaching the South Korea ice hockey team in October 2018.

On June 5, 2019 she was named head coach of the Saint Mary's University of Minnesota Cardinals women's ice hockey team.

Personal life
Her father is the head coach of the Western Michigan Broncos men's ice hockey team and the former head coach of the St. Louis Blues and Los Angeles Kings hockey teams in the National Hockey League (NHL). Her brothers, Brady and Jordy, also played hockey. Brady competed with the University of North Dakota men's ice hockey team and was a fifth round draft pick of the Los Angeles Kings in the 2003 NHL Entry Draft. Jordy also played at the collegiate level, competing at the University of Wisconsin. Murray and her two brothers hold US–Canadian dual citizenship.

Career stats

NCAA

Awards and honors
WCHA Scholar Athlete award (2008)
WCHA Scholar Athlete award (2009)
WCHA Scholar Athlete award (2010)

References

External links
 

Living people
1988 births
American ice hockey coaches
American women's ice hockey defensemen
Canadian ice hockey coaches
Canadian women's ice hockey defencemen
Ice hockey in South Korea
Ice hockey coaches from Minnesota
Minnesota Duluth Bulldogs women's ice hockey players
Swiss Women's League players
Ice hockey players from Minnesota